The American rock band Chevelle has released 9 studio albums, 2 compilation albums, 3 live albums, 2 DVDs, 29 singles, 1 promotional single, and 19 music videos. The band was originally formed in 1995 by two brothers Pete Loeffler (lead vocals and guitar) and Sam Loeffler (drums and percussion), along with Matt Scott (bass and backing vocals). Shortly after forming, Scott was replaced by Sam and Pete's brother, Joe Loeffler in 1996. Joe left the band in 2005 and Geno Lenardo joined as the touring bassist until he was replaced by Pete and Sam's brother-in-law, Dean Bernardini. Bernardini later left the band in 2019.

The band's debut studio album, Point #1, was released on a small record label called Squint Entertainment in May 1999. Chevelle's second album, Wonder What's Next was released in October 2002, was certified 2× Platinum by the RIAA after a debut at No. 14 on the United States albums chart, Billboard 200. The band's third album, This Type of Thinking (Could Do Us In) was released in September 2004 and debuted at No. 8, and has been certified Platinum. Chevelle's fourth album, Vena Sera, was released in April 2007 and has been certified Gold. Sci-Fi Crimes, their fifth album, was released in August 2009. Hats Off to the Bull, their sixth album, was released in December 2011. La Gárgola, their seventh album, was released in April 2014. Their eighth album, The North Corridor, was released in July 2016. Their ninth album, NIRATIAS, was released in March 2021.

Albums

Studio albums

Compilation albums

Live albums

A Split live album with Disturbed, Taproot and Ünloco from the second Music as a Weapon Tour.

Singles

Promotional singles

Video albums

Music videos

Cover songs
"Black Boys on Mopeds" by Sinéad O'Connor
"Black Hole Sun" by Soundgarden
"Delivery" by Compulsion
"High Visibility" by Helmet
"It's No Good" by Depeche Mode
"Pictures of You" by The Cure
"Quiet" by The Smashing Pumpkins
"Thieves" by Ministry

B-sides
"Build" — found on The Basement Tapes
"Commuter" — found on The Basement Tapes
"Credit to You" — found on The Basement Tapes
"Humidity" — found on The Basement Tapes
"Blind Beggar" — found on Commuter Trap Demo Tape
"Blast" — found on Commuter Trap Demo Tape
"Commuter Trap" — found on Commuter Trap Demo Tape
"Tom" — acoustic song found on The Blue Album
"Tetelestai" — found on The Blue Album
"All of Me" — unreleased song
"Moda" — unreleased song
"Send the Pain Below v103" — unreleased remix song
"The Clincher v103" — remix song found on the DualDisc version of This Type of Thinking (Could Do Us In), "Jars" single, and the 12 Bloody Spies compilation album
"Fizgig" found on Stray Arrows: A Collection of Favorites and the 12 Bloody Spies compilation album

Other appearances

Notes

References

External links
 Chevelle at Discogs

Discographies of American artists
Rock music group discographies